Eran Prion (born April 18, 1974), professionally known as Prayon, is an Israeli musician and music producer based in Tel Aviv and New York. He has composed scores and theme music for many TV shows, most notably ABC's Rising Star.

Prion was born in Tel Aviv and played in a number of bands during the 90's, most notably Hayevaniya releasing the hit song Hayevaniya hagdola in 1996. thereafter founding in 2006 the Israeli-based Prion Music, specializing in composing music scores mainly for television shows.

As a music producer, Prion has written and produced scores for many of the leading prime time TV shows in Israel, including "Big Brother", "Eretz Nehederet", "Raid the Cage", "BOOM!" and others. He has also worked on soundtracks for movies such as Charlie Wilson's War, and a number of international and United States television shows such as Without a Trace (CBS), Make It or Break It (ABC), The Hills (MTV), Rising Star (ABC), NCIS (CBS) and others.

Musical career 
Prion was born and raised in Tel Aviv, Israel. At the age of 16 he formed the punk metal band "Scaffold", having a debut release in 1991. In 1995 after serving in the Israeli Army, he went on to form the band "Hayevaniya" (the Greek) releasing a year later their lead single "Hayevaniya Hagdola" which had reached the number one spot in the Israeli music charts for a number of weeks, reaching number 30 in the Israeli Annual Hebrew Song Chart of 1997.

In 1999, Prion moved to the United States and begun producing records for local Hip-Hop artists, sharing a studio with producer RedOne. This collaboration led among other things to producing the single "Fredrik snortare & Cecilia Synd" by the Swedish artist Petter (reaching 11th place in the SWE charts). In these years Prion worked with a number of Pop and Hip-Hop musicians including Sean Paul, Beyoncé, Mobb Deep, Empire ISIS, G-UNIT, Pitbull and Beenie Man. During 2004, he started working with the New York-based 'Soundtrack' studio, producing and writing TV and Movie scores on a number of projects.

After having worked on a number of soundtracks and scores, in 2006 Prion returned to Israel and set up his own production company "Prion Music". The company headed by Prion had produced and written a large number of musical scores for television commercials; including for Levi's, Bratz, Motorola, Citroën, and a number of Israeli companies namely Tnuva, Strauss and Teva Pharmaceutical Industries. Also in recent years the company wrote and produced musical scores for television shows mostly Israeli, and mostly prime time family entertainment shows. Among these is the show Rising Star (HaKokhav HaBa in Israel), The USA version of which aired on ABC in the summer of 2014 including music produced by Prion. The studio has also produced the score music for the international game show Who's Still Standing? producing for 6 of the versions (Germany, Spain, Turkey, Hungary, Israel and Brazil; around 1,800 episodes up to date). Major Israeli musical projects include Eretz Nehederet, the Israeli version of Big Brother, Boom! and  Raid the Cage. International projects include shows such as Without a Trace (CBS), Make It or Break It (ABC), The Hills (MTV), NCIS (CBS) and others.

Selected television and movie credits

Featured music
 NCIS (2013), CBS.
 Make It or Break It (2012, 2009), ABC.
 Without a Trace (2011), CBS.
 Khloé & Lamar (2011), E!.
 Notes from the Underbelly (2008), Warner Bros. Television.
 The Hills (2008), MTV.
 Welcome to The Captain (2008), CBS Paramount.
 Charlie Wilson's War (2007), Universal Studios.

Original scores and theme music

References

External links
 http://prion-music.com/
 https://www.imdb.com/name/nm6610038/
 24–7 Press Release, "Empire Isis completes new tracks with producer Prayon for upcoming album release" (April 21, 2008), Montreal, Canada.

1974 births
Israeli rock musicians
People from Tel Aviv
Israeli composers
Television composers
Hip hop record producers
Israeli company founders
Living people